Joni Tuulola (born 1 January 1996) is a Finnish professional ice hockey defenceman who is currently playing with Tappara in the Finnish Liiga. He was selected 181st overall, by the Chicago Blackhawks in the 2015 NHL Entry Draft.

Playing career
On March 11, 2014, Tuulola made his Liiga debut playing with HPK during the 2013–14 Liiga season. Tuulola spent the first four seasons of his professional career with HPK, before opting to leave the club and sign a two-year contract with fellow Finnish outfit, Vaasan Sport, on April 11, 2017.

Upon completing the 2017–18 season with Sport having notched a career high 7 goals, 23 assists and 30 points, Tuulola was signed to a two-year, entry-level contract with the Chicago Blackhawks on March 27, 2018. He was immediately reassigned to begin his North American career with AHL affiliate, the Rockford IceHogs, on an amateur try-out contract.

As an impending restricted free agent with the Blackhawks, Tuulola left to return to Finland to start the 2020–21 season, agreeing to a one-year contract with KooKoo of the Liiga on 1 September 2020, with an NHL out clause until the new year.

Career statistics

Regular season and playoffs

International

References

External links

1996 births
Living people
Chicago Blackhawks draft picks
Finnish ice hockey defencemen
HPK players
People from Hämeenlinna
Rockford IceHogs (AHL) players
Vaasan Sport players
Ice hockey players at the 2012 Winter Youth Olympics
Youth Olympic gold medalists for Finland
Sportspeople from Kanta-Häme